Alken is a village in Skanderborg Municipality, Denmark.

References

Villages in Denmark
Populated places in Central Denmark Region
Skanderborg Municipality